Occipital neuritis may refer to:
 Whiplash injury, or post-traumatic neck extension injuries
 Occipital neuralgia